Charlie Fellows may refer to:

 Charlie Fellows (rugby union) (born 1988), English rugby union player
 Charlie Fellows (gymnast) (born 1997), English gymnast

See also
Charles Fellows, British archaeologist